The 1998 Internet Tax Freedom Act is a United States law authored by Representative Christopher Cox and Senator Ron Wyden, and signed into law as title XI of  on October 21, 1998 by President Bill Clinton in an effort to promote and preserve the commercial, educational, and informational potential of the Internet.  The law bars federal, state and local governments from taxing Internet access and from imposing discriminatory Internet-only taxes such as bit taxes, bandwidth taxes, and email taxes.  It also bars multiple taxes on electronic commerce.

One of the principal sponsors of the Act argued that the law also codifies the U.S. Supreme Court's Quill Corp. v. North Dakota decision and stipulates that no state shall collect a sales tax from retail purchases made over the internet or through a mail-order catalog unless the seller has a physical presence in the state attempting to collect such tax.   If a seller does have a physical presence in a state, then that seller may be required to collect the same state and local sales taxes as those collected on non-Internet sales.  The Act did not repeal any state sales or use tax. The U.S. Supreme Court's Quill Corp. v. North Dakota was overturned in June 2018 by South Dakota v. Wayfair.

The 1998 law also authorized the establishment of a study commission to study national tax policy with regard to the Internet. The Advisory Commission on Electronic Commerce studied the issue from 1999 to 2000.  The Commission was chaired by then-Virginia Governor James S. Gilmore, III, who led a majority coalition on the Commission to issue a final report opposing taxation of the Internet and eliminating the federal excise tax on telecommunications services, among other ideas.

The law was originally enacted as a ten-year moratorium.  It was then extended multiple times by the United States Congress, including several short-term extensions in 2014 and 2015:  President Barack Obama signed one extension on September 19, 2014, until December 11, 2014;  another one on December 16, 2014, in the Consolidated and Further Continuing Appropriations Act of 2015, until October 1, 2015; and yet another extension on September 30, 2015, in the Continuing Appropriations Act of 2016, which extended the Internet Tax Freedom Act through December 11, 2015.

Meanwhile, on July 15, 2014, the United States House of Representatives voted to pass the Permanent Internet Tax Freedom Act (H.R. 3086; 113th Congress), a bill that would amend the Internet Tax Freedom Act to make permanent the ban on state and local taxation of Internet access and on multiple or discriminatory taxes on electronic commerce.

On June 9, 2015, the United States House of Representatives voted and approved by voice vote H.R. 235, the Permanent Internet Tax Freedom Act (PITFA), which makes permanent the ban on federal, state, and local taxation of email and Internet access originally enacted in the Internet Tax Freedom Act. It had 188 cosponsors, with the majority of Republicans supporting the measure.  The bill was then included in the Trade Facilitation and Trade Enforcement Act of 2015 and passed the House 256-158 on December 11, 2015.  The Senate passed the bill on February 11, 2016.

The Internet Tax Freedom Act became permanent law when President Obama signed the Trade Facilitation and Trade Enforcement Act of 2015 on February 24, 2016.

See also
Internet taxes
Taxation of Digital Goods
Marketplace Fairness Act

References

External links
 Bill tracking with OpenCongress
 Bill tracking with GovTrack.us
 Public Law 105-277
 Bill tracking of proposed amendment at GovTrack.us
 Bill tracking with Washington Watch
 Cybertelecom :: Internet Taxation

105th United States Congress
United States federal taxation legislation
Riders to United States federal appropriations legislation
1998 in American law